Ali Bolagh (also Romanized as ‘Alī Bolāgh; also known as ‘Ālī Bolāghī) is a village in Bavaleh Rural District, in the Central District of Sonqor County, Kermanshah Province, Iran. At the 2006 census, its population was 114, in 21 families.

References 

Populated places in Sonqor County